Ju-Jitsu was introduced as a World Games sport at the 1997 World Games in Lahti.

Fighting

Men

−62 kg

−69 kg

−72 kg

−77 kg

−82 kg

−85 kg

−92 kg

−94 kg

+92 kg

+94 kg

Women

−55 kg

−58 kg

−62 kg

−68 kg

−70 kg

+68 kg

Duo

Men

Women

Mixed

Ne-waza

Men

−62 kg

−69 kg

−77 kg

−85 kg

−94 kg

+94 kg

Open

Women

−55 kg

−70 kg

Open

Mixed

Team competition

External links
 Sport 123 - World Games

 
Sports at the World Games